Jules Molk (8 December 1857 in Strasbourg, France – 7 May 1914 in Nancy)  was a French mathematician who worked on elliptic functions.

The French Academy of Sciences awarded him the Prix Binoux for 1913.

He was appointed to the chair of applied mathematics at the University of Nancy upon the death of Émile Léonard Mathieu in 1890. From 1902 until his death in 1914, Molk was the leader and editor-in-chief of the publication of a French encyclopedia of pure and applied mathematical sciences based upon Klein's encyclopedia. It was a translation of the volumes in German and required the collaboration of many mathematicians and theoretical physicists from France, Germany, and several other European countries. Among the noteworthy contributors are: Paul Appell, Felix Klein, Jacques Hadamard, David Hilbert, Émile Borel, Paul Montel, Maurice Fréchet, Édouard Goursat, Ernst Zermelo, Ernst Steinitz, Arthur Schoenflies, Philipp Furtwängler, Carl Runge, Vilfredo Pareto, Ernest Vessiot, Gino Fano, George Darwin, Paul Langevin, Jean Perrin, Karl Schwarzschild,  Pierre Boutroux, Edmond Bauer, Max Abraham, Arnold Sommerfeld, Ernest Esclangon,  Paul Ehrenfest, and Tatyana Pavlovna Ehrenfest.

In 1906 Molk was elected a member of the Academy of Sciences Leopoldina.

Publications

 Éléments de la théorie des fonctions elliptiques. Tome 1, sur Gallica.
 Éléments de la théorie des fonctions elliptiques. Tome 2, sur Gallica.
 Éléments de la théorie des fonctions elliptiques. Tome 4, sur Gallica.
 Éléments de la théorie des fonctions elliptiques Volumes 1 et 2, sur Archive.org.
 Éléments de la théorie des fonctions elliptiques Tome 1, sur Archive.org.

Encyclopédie des sciences mathématiques pures et appliquées
 Site des Editions Jacques Gabay
 Linum, livres numériques mathématiques
 Encyclopédie des sciences mathématiques pures et appliquées Volume 1, sur Archive.org.
 Encyclopédie des sciences mathématiques pures et appliquées Tome 4 Volume 2, sur IRIS.
 Encyclopédie des sciences mathématiques pures et appliquées Tome 2, Premier volume, sur Gallica.
 Encyclopédie des sciences mathématiques pures et appliquées Tome 2, Deuxième volume, sur Gallica.
 Encyclopédie des sciences mathématiques pures et appliquées Tome 4, Cinquième volume, sur Gallica.
 Encyclopédie des sciences mathématiques pures et appliquées Tome 4, Sixième volume, sur Gallica.

References

 Hélène Gispert (1999) "Les débuts de l'histoire des mathématiques sur les scènes internationales et le cas de l'entreprise encyclopédique de Felix Klein et Jules Molk", Historia Mathematica 26(4):344–60.

French mathematicians